Moonrise Kingdom is a 2012 American coming-of-age film directed by Wes Anderson, written by Anderson and Roman Coppola, and described as an "eccentric, pubescent love story". It features newcomers Jared Gilman and Kara Hayward in the main roles and an ensemble cast. The film premiered at the 2012 Cannes Film Festival.

Moonrise Kingdom received critical acclaim; review aggregation website Rotten Tomatoes gives the film a rating of 93% based on reviews from 239 critics, with an average score of 8.2/10. The consensus states, "Warm, whimsical, and poignant, the immaculately framed and beautifully acted Moonrise Kingdom presents writer/director Wes Anderson at his idiosyncratic best".  Review aggregation website Metacritic gives the film a weighted average score of 84 (out of 100), based on 43 reviews, indicating "universal acclaim". Moonrise Kingdom was also listed on many critics' top 10 lists of the year.

At Cannes, the film was in competition for the Palme d'Or, although the only award it won there was the unofficial "Palme de Whiskers" in recognition of the cat, "Tabitha". The film was nominated for the Academy Award for Best Original Screenplay, and the Golden Globe for Best Musical or Comedy. The film was later included in the BBC's 100 Greatest Films of the 21st Century.

Accolades

References

External links
 

Lists of accolades by film